The 2016 Meiji Yasuda J1 League (2016 明治安田生命J1リーグ) season was the 51st season of top-flight football in Japan, and the 24th since the establishment of the J.League in 1993.

For a five-year period starting in 2015, the J.League changed to a newly conceived multistage system, with the year split into two halves and a third and final championship stage. The winners of the first and second stages and the highest ranking club of the aggregate table (other than the first or second stage winners) qualified for the Championship Stage. Kashima Antlers, the winner of the Championship Stage, advanced to the 2016 FIFA Club World Cup as the host nation's entrant.

Clubs

Managerial changes

Foreign players

Players name in bold indicates the player is registered during the mid-season transfer window.

Format
Teams play a single round-robin in the first stage and a single round-robin in the second stage. After that an overall table is calculated and a championship stage is played. The winners of the first and second stages and any team that finishes in the top 3 of the overall rankings advance to the championship stage. The team that finishes atop the overall table automatically qualifies for the final, while the remaining teams play-off for the other spot in the final.

League table

First stage

Second stage

Overall table

Positions by round

First stage

Second stage

Overall

Championship stage
Meiji Yasuda 2016 J.League Championship (明治安田生命 2016 Jリーグチャンピオンシップ)
The Championship stage consisted of a knockout tournament involving the champions of the First and Second stages, and any team that finishes in the top 3 of the overall table. The team with the best aggregate record earned a bye to the final. The remaining teams playoff for the other spot in the final.

Results

First stage

Second stage

Top scorers

Updated to games played on 3 November 2016

Source: J. League data site

Awards

Individual

Best Eleven

Source:

Attendances
These are the attendance records of each of the teams at the end of the home and away season. The table does not include the Championship stages attendances.

References

J1 League seasons
1
Japan
Japan